The Flexity 2 is a family of tram or light-rail vehicle manufactured by Bombardier Transportation (later Alstom). It is 100% low-floor, in order to easily accommodate wheelchairs and pushchairs. The trams are bi-directional, with cabs at both ends and doors on both sides, and are articulated with five or seven sections. This family of trams debuted on the Blackpool Tramway, England.

Introduction
The Flexity 2 is an evolution of Bombardier's successful Flexity family of LRVs and is designed to be highly customisable. It incorporates a number of significant advances over its predecessor including improved corrosion resistance, enhanced safety through a redesigned cab with improved impact protection, improved energy efficiency through the inclusion of cells to store energy temporarily after braking which achieves double the energy saving of feeding it back through the wires, reduced mass, optional support for its Primove under track power transmission system and the new Flexx Urban 3000 bogie which allows the LRV to run on conventional wheelsets. The vehicle also features improved air-conditioning and a wider more spacious interior via the reduction in the width of its sidewalls allowing more seating or other uses. These changes have resulted in a very slight increase in axle load, although Bombardier says this does not limit the operational capabilities of the vehicle.

The launch customer was Blackpool Transport which ordered 16 units in July 2009 to replace its tourist-focused and high-maintenance heritage fleet with a new vehicle suitable for daily commuters. The worldwide launch of the tram, including showing the first new tram occurred on 8 September 2011, at the new Starr Gate depot in Blackpool.

Additional orders came from G:link ordering 23 for operation on the Gold Coast, Australia, Basler Verkehrs-Betriebe ordering 60 for Basel, Switzerland, De Lijn ordering in total 88 for Antwerp and Ghent, Belgium and SND ordering 18 for Suzhou New District, Suzhou, China built by CRRC Nanjing Puzhen under a Bombardier technology licence agreement.

Technical specifications

Low-floor versions

Gallery

References

External links
Bombardier Transportation Flexity 2

Alstom trams
Articulated passenger trains
Flexity 2
Tram vehicles of the United Kingdom
Train-related introductions in 2010
600 V DC multiple units
750 V DC multiple units